Gastrointestinal Nursing is a monthly peer-reviewed nursing journal covering research and clinical work on the practice of gastrointestinal nursing. It is published by MA Healthcare. It is indexed in Scopus.

References

External links
 

General nursing journals
Publications established in 2003
English-language journals
Gastroenterology and hepatology journals
10 times per year journals